Splendid Folly is a 1919 British silent romance film directed by Arrigo Bocchi and starring Manora Thew, Hayford Hobbs and Evelyn Harding. The film is set in Naples and was shot on location in Italy, and at Catford Studios in London. It is based on a novel by Margaret Pedlar.

Plot
A playwright's wife leaves him when she mistakenly believes he has taken a mistress. She becomes a renowned opera singer.

Cast
 Manora Thew as Diana Quentin  
 Hayford Hobbs as Mr. Errington  
 Evelyn Harding as Adrienne de Gervais  
 Charles Vane as Baroni 
 Bert Wynne   
 Peggy Patterson  
 George Butler
 Eileen McGrath
 James English

References

Bibliography
 Low, Rachael. History of the British Film, 1918-1929. George Allen & Unwin, 1971.

External links

1919 films
1919 romantic drama films
British silent feature films
British romantic drama films
Films set in Italy
Films directed by Arrigo Bocchi
Films based on British novels
British black-and-white films
1910s English-language films
1910s British films
Silent romantic drama films